The VMG 1927 is a light machine gun designed by Heinrich Vollmer at 1927.

In 1916 Heinrich Vollmer began working on a design of a light machine gun. At the end the weapon was known as a MG Vollmer, later also as VMG 1927.

It consisted of only 78 parts while the standard MG of those days, the MG 08/15 consisted of 383 parts. It operated on the principle of short recoil with a rotary locking mechanism for the bolt, carried by helical grooves. It was fed from a small drum magazine underneath the receiver.

In 1927 Vollmer also obtained a patent covering the breech mechanism of the weapon.  Later on, Vollmer co-developed the gun with Mauser Werke as the MV 31 (Mauser-Vollmer 1931). It was offered to the German ordnance board (Inspektion für Waffen und Gerät - IWG) but, after testing, it was not adopted for service. This gun had a quick-change barrel and used a drum magazine.

Two examples are known to exist, one is at the Wehrtechnische Studiensammlung Koblenz and the other at the Vojenský historický ústav Praha.

References

External links
 Photo (middle)

7.92×57mm Mauser machine guns
Light machine guns
Machine guns of Germany
World War II infantry weapons of Germany
World War II machine guns